M. O. Hasan Farook Maricar (6 September 1937 – 26 January 2012) was a three-time Chief Minister of the Union Territory of Pondicherry.  He was the youngest chief minister of any Union Territory of India.  He served from 9 April 1967 to 6 March 1968 and 17 March 1969 to 3 January 1974 and from 1985 to 1990  He was thrice elected to the Lok Sabha from Pondicherry in 1991, 1996 and 1999 and served as a Union Minister of State for Civil Aviation and Tourism during June 1991 – December 1992. He participated in the struggle for liberation of Pondicherry as a student, during 1953–54 when Pondicherry was a French colony and served as a Member of the Central Haj Committee in Mumbai from 1975 to 2000. He was appointed the Indian Ambassador to Saudi Arabia in September 2004.

Governor
Farook was appointed Governor of Jharkhand in 2010 and of Kerala in 2011.

Death 

He died in office on 26 January 2012 at 9:10 pm at Apollo Hospital in Chennai, due to multiple myeloma and kidney related ailments. He was 74 years old at the time of his death. He was the second governor who died in office, after Sikander Bakht, and is the shortest-served governor of Kerala. He was hospitalised for more than a month, and his condition deteriorated in the days preceding his death. As he was near death, additional charge was given to the then Karnataka Governor Hansraj Bhardwaj. In his absence, the flag hoisting ceremony of Republic Day of India in Thiruvananthapuram was conducted by the then Chief Minister of Kerala, Oommen Chandy. He was buried with full state honours at Puducherry Juma Masjid.

References 

1937 births
2012 deaths
Deaths from multiple myeloma
Chief ministers of Puducherry
Governors of Jharkhand
Governors of Kerala
20th-century Indian Muslims
People from Karaikal district
India MPs 1991–1996
India MPs 1996–1997
Lok Sabha members from Puducherry
India MPs 1999–2004
Ambassadors of India to Saudi Arabia
Chief ministers from Indian National Congress
Chief ministers from Dravida Munnetra Kazhagam
Indian National Congress politicians from Puducherry
Deaths from cancer in India